United Nations Security Council resolution 1025, adopted unanimously on 30 November 1995, after recalling resolutions 981 (1995) and 1023 (1995) on Croatia, the Council decided that the mandate of the United Nations Confidence Restoration Operation (UNCRO) would terminate after an interim period ending 15 January 1996.

The Council once again reaffirmed that Eastern Slavonia, Baranja and Western Syrmia (known as Sector East) were integral parts of Croatia and the importance it attached for respect of human rights and fundamental freedoms.

Acting under Chapter VII of the United Nations Charter, the Secretary-General Boutros Boutros-Ghali was requested to report to the council by 14 December 1995 on proposals for a transitional authority and peacekeeping force in the aforementioned regions to implement the Basic Agreement. It was also decided that, in order for the transitional authority to be established, UNCRO's mandate would end on 15 January 1996 or when the Security Council decided on the deployment of the authority and peacekeeping force.

See also
 Bosnian War
 Breakup of Yugoslavia
 Croatian War of Independence
 SAO Eastern Slavonia, Baranja and Western Syrmia
 List of United Nations Security Council Resolutions 1001 to 1100 (1995–1997)
 Yugoslav Wars
 United Nations Transitional Authority for Eastern Slavonia, Baranja and Western Sirmium
 Joint Council of Municipalities

References

External links
 
Text of the Resolution at undocs.org

 1025
 1025
1995 in Yugoslavia
1995 in Croatia
 1025
 1025
Joint Council of Municipalities
November 1995 events